Mufti Bashir-ud-din Farooqi (also known as Mufti Bashiruddin Ahmad) (1934 – 12 February 2019) was an Indian Muslim scholar and jurist who served as Grand Mufti of Jammu and Kashmir from 1960 to 2012.

Biography
Farooqi was born in 1934 and acquired his primary education in Srinagar. He received an LLB and masters degree in Arabic from Aligarh Muslim University. In 1960, he succeeded his father Qayam u Din as the Grand Mufti of Jammu and Kashmir.

In 2007, the mufti criticized British government, when it addressed Salman Rushdie with the title of Sir. The mufti said that Rushdie was an apostate and this title was part of a broader conspiracy against Islam. In 2013, he faced a severe backlash after he issued a fatwa against all-girl rock bands in Kashmir. The mufti had asked girls to stay away from music, and regarded it as impermissible.

Farooqi had nominated his son Nasir ul Islam for the position on 8 July 2012 who succeeded him as the Grand Mufti of Jammu and Kashmir.

He died on 12 February 2019. His death was condoled by Satya Pal Malik, Omar Abdullah and Mehbooba Mufti.

References

1934 births
2019 deaths
Aligarh Muslim University alumni
Muftis
Kashmiri Muslims
Indian people of Kashmiri descent
People from Srinagar